Polish I Corps  may refer to:

 Polish I Corps in Russia, during World War I
 I Polish Corps, part of the Polish Blue Army
 Polish I Corps in the Soviet Union, during World War II, on March 16, 1944 expanded into the Polish First Army
 I Corps (Polish Armed Forces in the West), during World War II